Dakota Barnathan (born November 9, 1994) is an American professional soccer player who currently plays for the Richmond Kickers in USL League One.

Career

Early career
Barnathan played college soccer at Virginia Commonwealth University from 2013 and 2016, spending 2012 redshirted. While at VCU, Barnathan played for USL PDL sides Long Island Rough Riders and Portland Timbers U23s.

Professional
On January 17, 2017,  Barnathan was selected by FC Dallas in the third round of the 2017 Major League Soccer SuperDraft as the 59th overall pick.

Unsigned by Dallas, Barnathan joined United Soccer League side Swope Park Rangers on February 24, 2017. Barnathan was released by Swope Park on December 3, 2018. He subsequently signed with Ottawa Fury FC of the USL Championship on January 31, 2019.

In March 2021, after one season with Pittsburgh Riverhounds SC, Barnathan joined USL League One side FC Tucson.

Barnathan returned to Virginia in February 2022, signing with USL League One club Richmond Kickers.

Career statistics

Honors

Club
Swope Park Rangers
United Soccer League Cup: Runner-up 2017

References

External links

1994 births
Living people
American soccer players
Association football defenders
People from Massapequa, New York
FC Dallas draft picks
VCU Rams men's soccer players
Long Island Rough Riders players
Portland Timbers U23s players
Ottawa Fury FC players
Sporting Kansas City II players
Pittsburgh Riverhounds SC players
FC Tucson players
Richmond Kickers players
Soccer players from New York (state)
Sportspeople from Nassau County, New York
USL Championship players
USL League Two players